Stejeriş may refer to several villages in Romania:

 Stejeriş, a village in Moldovenești Commune, Cluj County
 Stejeriş, a village in Acățari Commune, Mureș County

See also 
 Stejar (disambiguation)
 Stejaru (disambiguation)